Francis Norman Aplin  (17 September 1901–18 February 1965) was a New Zealand police officer. He was born in Crofton, Wellington, New Zealand, on 17 September 1901.

In the 1959 Queen's Birthday Honours, Aplin was awarded the Queen's Police Medal for distinguished service.

References

1901 births
1965 deaths
New Zealand police officers
People from Wellington City
New Zealand recipients of the Queen's Police Medal